The Overstreet House, near Cowlington, Oklahoma is a frame house which was built in 1891.  It was listed on the National Register of Historic Places in 1980.

It was home of T.G. Overstreet who came from Springfield, Missouri to the Short Mountain area in the Indian Territory in the early
1870s. He died at age 93 and is buried in the family cemetery nearby.

The house includes some elements of Victorian or possibly Italianate architecture.

References

National Register of Historic Places in Le Flore County, Oklahoma
Victorian architecture in Oklahoma
Houses completed in 1891
LeFlore County, Oklahoma